Eupodalecia is a genus of beetles in the family Buprestidae, containing the following species:

 Eupodalecia achardi (Obenberger, 1928)
 Eupodalecia anniae (Obenberger, 1928)
 Eupodalecia boliviana Obenberger, 1958
 Eupodalecia brasiliana (Obenberger, 1922)
 Eupodalecia fissivertex Obenberger, 1958
 Eupodalecia linnei (Obenberger, 1922)
 Eupodalecia lucniki (Obenberger, 1928)
 Eupodalecia manaosensis Obenberger, 1958
 Eupodalecia minarum Obenberger, 1958
 Eupodalecia pedroi Obenberger, 1958
 Eupodalecia perfecta (Kerremans, 1919)

References

Buprestidae genera